Angelica Guerrero-Cuellar is a Democratic member of the Illinois House of Representatives from the 22nd district since February 25, 2021. The 22nd district, located in the Chicago area, includes parts of Bedford Park and Burbank and includes all or parts of the Chicago neighborhoods of Archer Heights, Ashburn, Brighton Park, Chicago Lawn, Clearing, Gage Park, Garfield Ridge, West Elsdon, and West Lawn.

Early life, education, and career
Guerrero-Cuellar grew up in South Lawndale, Chicago in Little Village and later in West Lawn, Chicago. She is the daughter of immigrant parents who originated from the state of Puebla in Mexico.

Illinois House of Representatives
Guerrero-Cuellar was appointed by the Democratic Party to replace Edward Guerra Kodatt in the Illinois House of Representatives who resigned after three days in office. Kodatt was appointed to the Illinois General Assembly when Michael Madigan resigned from the Illinois General Assembly. Guerrero-Cuellar was sworn into office on February 25, 2021.

As of July 3, 2022, Representative Guerrero-Cuellar is a member of the following Illinois House committees:

 Appropriations - General Service Committee (HAPG)
 Health Care Availability & Access Committee (HHCA)
 Mental Health & Addiction Committee (HMEH)
 Police & Fire Committee (SHPF)
 Transportation: Regulation, Roads & Bridges Committee (HTRR)
 Transportation: Vehicles & Safety (HVES)

References

External links
 Representative Angelica Guerrero-Cuellar (D) at the Illinois General Assembly website

Living people
Politicians from Chicago
Hispanic and Latino American women in politics
Hispanic and Latino American state legislators in Illinois
Women state legislators in Illinois
Democratic Party members of the Illinois House of Representatives
Year of birth missing (living people)
21st-century American women